This list contains the names of albums that contain a hidden track and also information on how to find them. Not all printings of an album contain the same track arrangements, so some copies of a particular album may not have the hidden track(s) listed below. Some of these tracks may be hidden in the pregap, and some hidden simply as a track following the listed tracks. The list is ordered by artist name using the surname where appropriate.

 k-os:an
 Exit: There are three bonus tracks on the album: the single "Superstarr, Pt. Zero," a Remix of "Heaven Only Knows," and a track called "Neutroniks," which does not appear on the Canadian version of the album, but on the Canadian pressing of Joyful Rebellion.
 Joyful Rebellion: Roughly two mutes after the track "Papercutz" ends, a hidden track called "The Mirror" begins.
 Atlantis: Hymns for Disco: "Chocolate Chewing Gum" follows after "The Ballad of Noah" at 5:27
 Yes!: hidden tracks appear at the ends of "FUN!," "Mr. Telephone Man," and "The Avenue."
 K-Passa: Born Again: The last billed track, "Loves Trainee," is followed by five minutes of silence and then an eight-minute instrumental track.
 Kamelot, The Black Halo: Rewind from track 1 to hear a couple entering a theatre.
 Yoko Kanno, into the another world: "Mameshiba (instrumental version)" follows after "Aqua" at 6:22
 Kansas, Somewhere to Elsewhere: "Geodesic Dome" at the end of the album.
 Kano: At the end of the "London Town" album, there is a hidden track called "Grime MC"
 Lucy Kaplansky: Rewind 3:30 from Track 1 on the "Flesh & Bone" album, there is a hidden version of Paul McCartney's "I've Just Seen a Face"
 Kasabian:
 Kasabian: The Jacknife Lee Mix of "Reason is Treason" after three minutes silence at 7:07 of "U Boat."
 Empire: "Rick's Tune" plays after ten minutes of silence following "The Doberman" (special edition only).
 Keane, Under the Iron Sea: "The Iron Sea" follows the track "Put It Behind You" and acts as a turning point of the album, indicated by the color change on the album's track listing.
 Tommy Keene, Ten Years After: Track 13, a cover of The Who's "It's Not True," is not listed.
 Kelis, Kelis Was Here: "Fuck Them Bitches" after a minute of silence on the final track it has this song.
 Paul Kelly & The Messengers, Comedy: "David Gower" to the tune of Guantanamera after the last track.
 Kenickie:
 At The Club: The hidden track "Montrose Gimps It Up For Charity" can be found at 8:52 into the final track "Acetone."
 Get In: "Disco Xmas on the Dole," appears at 10:00 on end track "Something's Got To Give." The song is sung by Emmy-Kate Montrose under heavy distortion.
 Kerion (band), Holy creatures quest: Track 14 contains an acoustic version of "The last quest", this track is not on the album cover.
 Alicia Keys, Songs in a Minor: The hidden track "Lovin' You" starts playing at the end of the album.
 Kid Rock, Devil Without a Cause: Shortly after the last song ("Black Chick, White Guy" on the explicit version, "Where U at Rock" on the clean version) is a techno rock remix of "I Am the Bullgod."
 Kidz in the Hall, School Was My Hustle: The hidden track "We Almost Lost" follows "Day By Day" at the end of track 12.
 Kaki King, Legs to Make Us Longer: "Nails" after the final track.
 The Killers, Sawdust: "Questions with the Captain" after 55 seconds of silence after the final track.
 King Diamond, Voodoo: There is a hidden track (1:50) after "Aftermath" on the European release which is basically "Unclean Spirits" played backwards.
 King Crimson, 
In the Court of the Crimson King: After the title track is finished, a series of sounds like the ones that begin the album can be heard on some vinyl and CD pressings.
Islands: After the final track, "Islands," an instrumental ensemble is heard tuning while receiving instructions from guitarist Robert Fripp.
 Kings of Leon, Youth and Young Manhood: "Talihina Sky" at the end of "Holy Roller Novocaine" at 8:21.
 KISS, Destroyer: "Rock & Roll Party" either at the end of "Do You Love Me" (3:34) or as a separate track.
 Klaatu, Hope: The final song "Hope" ends at minute 3:50. After 10 seconds of silence, begins an instrumental reprise of the first track, "We're Off You Know".
 Klark Kent, Kollected Works: The final track is labeled as "Office Talk," but contains both "Office Talk" and "Guerrilla," with roughly 40 seconds of silence between the two songs.
 Klaxons, Myths of the Near Future: An experimental instrumental follows final track "Four Horsemen of 2012"
 Klee: Unverwundbar: A French version of the Song "Lichtstrahl" follows final track "Ich lebe".
 KMFDM, Nihil: "Nihil" at the end of the song "Trust" (only on Wax Trax! Records/TVT Records release).
 Kool Moe Dee, Knowledge Is King: The track "Let's Go" is not listed in the sleeve, though it appears in the album.
 Korn:
 Follow the Leader: The album starts on track 13, after 12 tracks consisting of five seconds of silence each, making a minute's silence out of respect for a deceased fan, who also had track 22 (Justin) named after him. "Earache My Eye" starts at the end of the song "My Gift to You" (Track 25) at 9:12, two minutes after "My Gift to You" ends. The hidden track is 6:28.
 Korn: After a period of silence which follows track 12 ("Daddy"), a man and woman argue about car parts. The hidden track is called "Michael & Geri"
 Life Is Peachy: An a cappella version of "Twist" after "Kill You." On picture vinyl version, an instrumental track after Good God.
 Take a Look in the Mirror: A live cover version of Metallica's "One" after "When Will This End."
 Untouchables: Some versions contain a hidden remix of "Here to Stay."
 Issues: While not technically a hidden track, the final track "Dirty" features several minutes of static buzzing after the song itself ends.
 See You on the Other Side: some copies have part of "Twisted Transistor" in the pregap. While it is listed, copies with the song at 3:08 have what was removed from the 4:12 version in the pregap. Not really hidden, but it is in the pregap.
 Wayne Kramer: The Hard Stuff: Tracks 11 to 39 are blank, each of 5 seconds duration, followed by unlisted track 40 "So Long, Hank" (4:34)
 Kreator: Cause for Conflict: on Isolation's end there's about 4 blank minutes, following the hidden track
 Kris Kristofferson, Closer to the Bone: Ten seconds of silence following "The Wonder" after which an untitled hidden track, introduced as the first song Kristofferson ever wrote at the age of 11, is played.
 Kula Shaker:
 K: An untitled 15-second long vocal montage at about 19:13 of the last album track
 Peasants, Pigs & Astronauts: "Stotra," a mantra, can be found at about 10:10 into track 12, with a short silent track as track 13
 Kollected - The Best of: "Strangefolk"
 Kyuss:
 Welcome to Sky Valley: "Lick Doo," a doo-wop prank, is hidden after the final track '"Whitewater"
 ...And the Circus Leaves Town: Two short hidden tracks are included in the 20-odd minutes of silence following "Spaceship Landing," the second of which is titled "Day One"

See also
 List of backmasked messages
 List of albums with tracks hidden in the pregap

References 

K